"Jackie Down the Line" is a song by Irish band, Fontaines D.C. The song is the lead single off of their third studio album, Skinty Fia and was released on 12 January 2022.

"Jackie Down the Line" is the band's first song to chart in the United States, reaching number 40 in the Billboard Adult Alternative Airplay.

Music and lyrics 
The song is performed in a G major key and has a tempo of 135 beats per minute. It has a standard tuning.

Background and release 
The song was released on 12 January 2022 in both physical, digital, and streaming content. It jointly announced as the lead single off of Skinty Fia, the third studio album by the band.

Critical reception 
"Jackie Down the Line" received positive critical reception. Joe Taysom, writing for Far Out Magazine described "Jackie Down the Line" as a track that fits more in the darker sound of the band. Specifically, Taysom said: "Rather than being a dancefloor filler, the heartfelt track retains that sense of gloom associated with frontman Grian Chatten thanks to his confessional, self-loathing brand of lyricism which has made him emerge as one of the great modern-day songwriters."

In an interview with Pitchfork, the song was described as "remorseless misanthrope at the center of mesmeric" single.

Music video 
The music video for "Jackie Down the Line" premiered on the band's YouTube channel on 11 January 2022. The music video was directed by Hugh Mulhern and produced by Alexander Handschuh, Kate Brady, and Laura Clayton. The music video features choreography from Blackhaine.

Live performance 
Fontaines D.C. first performed the song live on 14 January 2022 on The Tonight Show Starring Jimmy Fallon. Sam Moore with the New Musical Express described the performance as "surreal". Moore described the video and the performance as a "seemingly one-take video performing the track on stage, a strange set of events takes place around them which involves people dressed in pointed red hats, a bride and a crucifixion."

Credits and personnel

Song 
Fontaines D.C.
 Grian Chatten – vocals, 12-string acoustic guitar, tambourine
 Carlos O'Connell – guitar, art direction
 Conor Curley – guitar
 Tom Coll – drums, percussion
 Conor Deegan III – bass guitar

Additional personnel
 Dan Carey – production, mixing, sonic manipulation, synthesizer
 Christian Wright – mastering
 Alexis Smith – engineering
 Aidan Cochrane – art direction, design
 Rory Dewar – design
 Ashley Willerton – lettering

Music video 

 Director – Hugh Mulhern
 Producer – Alexander Handschuh
 Executive producer – Kate Brady and Laura Clayton
 Production company – Riff Raff Films
 DP – Eoin McLoughlin
 1st AC – Karl Hui
 2nd AC – Nina Mangold
 DIT – Ewan MacFarlan
 Key grip – Johnny Donne
 2nd grip – Simon Ward
 Choreography – Blackhaine
 1st AD – Daniel Castro Garcia

 Production assistant – Angela Mulhern
 Floor runner – Nicolay Milev
 Stylist – Celestine Cooney
 Stylist assistant – Honor Dangerfield
 Make-up – Alice Dodds
 Make-up assistant – Nik Paskauskas
 Production designer – Andy Hillman
 Designer co-ordinator – Saskia Wickins
 Design assistants – Rosie Gore, Laurel Sumner, Killian Fallon and Tonomi Kishimoto-Eley
 Editor – John Cutler
 Grade – Peter Oppersdorff at MPC
 Cast – Blackhaine, Gina Campone, Luca Bakos, Kaivalya Brewerton and Bianca Scout

Charts

References 

2022 singles
2022 songs
Fontaines D.C. songs
Partisan Records singles